Mampang may refer to:

Mampang Prapatan, Indonesia
Steve Jackson's Sorcery!#Plot